Paul Enuki (born 2 November 1969) is a Papua New Guinean weightlifter. He competed in the men's middle heavyweight event at the 1992 Summer Olympics.

References

1969 births
Living people
Papua New Guinean male weightlifters
Olympic weightlifters of Papua New Guinea
Weightlifters at the 1992 Summer Olympics
Place of birth missing (living people)